

C07A Beta blocking agents

C07AA Beta blocking agents, non-selective
C07AA01 Alprenolol
C07AA02 Oxprenolol
C07AA03 Pindolol
C07AA05 Propranolol
C07AA06 Timolol
C07AA07 Sotalol
C07AA12 Nadolol
C07AA14 Mepindolol
C07AA15 Carteolol
C07AA16 Tertatolol
C07AA17 Bopindolol
C07AA19 Bupranolol
C07AA23 Penbutolol
C07AA27 Cloranolol
QC07AA90 Carazolol

C07AB Beta blocking agents, selective
C07AB01 Practolol
C07AB02 Metoprolol
C07AB03 Atenolol
C07AB04 Acebutolol
C07AB05 Betaxolol
C07AB06 Bevantolol
C07AB07 Bisoprolol
C07AB08 Celiprolol
C07AB09 Esmolol
C07AB10 Epanolol
C07AB11 S-atenolol
C07AB12 Nebivolol
C07AB13 Talinolol
C07AB14 Landiolol

C07AG Alpha and beta blocking agents
C07AG01 Labetalol
C07AG02 Carvedilol

C07B Beta blocking agents and thiazides

C07BA Beta blocking agents, non-selective, and thiazides
C07BA02 Oxprenolol and thiazides
C07BA05 Propranolol and thiazides
C07BA06 Timolol and thiazides
C07BA07 Sotalol and thiazides
C07BA12 Nadolol and thiazides
C07BA68 Metipranolol and thiazides, combinations

C07BB Beta blocking agents, selective, and thiazides
C07BB02 Metoprolol and thiazides
C07BB03 Atenolol and thiazides
C07BB04 Acebutolol and thiazides
C07BB06 Bevantolol and thiazides
C07BB07 Bisoprolol and thiazides
C07BB12 Nebivolol and thiazides
C07BB52 Metoprolol and thiazides, combinations

C07BG Alpha and beta blocking agents and thiazides
C07BG01 Labetalol and thiazides

C07C Beta blocking agents and other diuretics

C07CA Beta blocking agents, non-selective, and other diuretics
C07CA02 Oxprenolol and other diuretics
C07CA03 Pindolol and other diuretics
C07CA17 Bopindolol and other diuretics
C07CA23 Penbutolol and other diuretics

C07CB Beta blocking agents, selective, and other diuretics
C07CB02 Metoprolol and other diuretics
C07CB03 Atenolol and other diuretics
C07CB53 Atenolol and other diuretics, combinations

C07CG Alpha and beta blocking agents and other diuretics
C07CG01 Labetalol and other diuretics

C07D Beta blocking agents, thiazides and other diuretics

C07DA Beta blocking agents, non-selective, thiazides and other diuretics
C07DA06 Timolol, thiazides and other diuretics

C07DB Beta blocking agents, selective, thiazides and other diuretics
C07DB01 Atenolol, thiazides and other diuretics

C07E Beta blocking agents and vasodilators

C07EA Beta blocking agents, non-selective, and vasodilators

C07EB Beta blocking agents, selective, and vasodilators

C07F Beta blocking agents, other combinations

C07FB Beta blocking agents and calcium channel blockers
C07FB02 Metoprolol and felodipine
C07FB03 Atenolol and nifedipine
C07FB07 Bisoprolol and amlodipine
C07FB12 Nebivolol and amlodipine
C07FB13 Metoprolol and amlodipine

C07FX Beta blocking agents, other combinations
C07FX01 Propranolol and other combinations
C07FX02 Sotalol and acetylsalicylic acid
C07FX03 Metoprolol and acetylsalicylic acid
C07FX04 Bisoprolol and acetylsalicylic acid
C07FX05 Metoprolol and ivabradine
C07FX06 Carvedilol and ivabradine

References

C07